The .338 Whisper is a wildcat cartridge
in the Whisper family, a group of cartridges developed in the early 1990s by J.D. Jones of SSK Industries. Unlike the smaller caliber cartridges in the Whisper family, loads for the .338 Whisper are mainly limited to subsonic velocities.

Versions
There are three versions of the .338 Whisper:

The original .338 Whisper #1 (metric: 8.6x38mm) is based on the 7mm BR Remington case, necked up (enlarged) to take a .338" bullet. As the 7mm Bench Rest and .308 Winchester cases share the same case head dimensions, conversion to .338 Whisper from a rifle previously chambered in .308 Winchester (or any cartridge based on the .308 Winchester case, such as .243 Winchester, .260 Remington,  7 mm-08 Remington, etc...) is a relatively simple task.
The second version (called .338 Whisper #2 by SSK, metric: 8.6x35mm) is based on the .221 Remington Fireball case, simplifying conversion of firearms chambered in 5.56×45mm or its commercial counterpart, .223 Remington.

Subsonic
A subsonic cartridge is designed to fire its bullets at velocities slower than the speed of sound (1128 ft/s at 70 °F) to avoid the sonic crack caused by the bullet breaking the sound barrier, which contributes in large part to the overall noise produced when using a firearm. Subsonic loads are often designed to avoid the turbulent transonic zone (~900ft/s - 1350ft/s or 0.8 to 1.2 mach) entirely. This allows the firearm to be suppressed relatively easily. To ensure terminal performance at subsonic velocities, heavy bullets for the caliber are desirable. Of course the silent, subsonic loads should be loaded below the speed of sound with preferably the heaviest and longest bullet the .338 calibre has to offer.

Supersonic
Only those .338 based on the 7mmBR case offer meaningful supersonic velocities. Often found to be too explosive in high power rifles, at such moderate speeds the Ballistic Tips provide both expansion and penetration - this combination with excellent accuracy and a high ballistic coefficient.

Trademark 
"Whisper" is a registered trademark of SSK Industries. In order to sidestep this branding (and/or any licensing fees required to use the "Whisper" name legally), other manufacturers tend to use different names for cartridges in the Whisper family. For example, .338 Murmur, .338 Phantom and .338 Benchrest. The .300 Whisper (the most popular cartridge of the family) is often called ".300 Fireball" or ".300-221".

See also 
 List of rifle cartridges
 8 mm caliber

References

External links
SSK Industries
https://web.archive.org/web/20110510011521/http://www.sskindustries.com/cartridges.htm

Pistol and rifle cartridges
Whisper cartridges
Subsonic rifle cartridges
Wildcat cartridges